Francis Lyall "Frank" Birch,  (5 December 1889 – 14 February 1956) was a British cryptographer and actor. He was educated at Eton College and King's College, Cambridge.

During World War I, he served as a lieutenant commander with the Royal Naval Volunteer Reserve, and served in the Atlantic, the Channel and the Dardanelles before joining the Naval Intelligence Division (Room 40) from 1916-19. Birch wrote a satirical history of Room 40, Alice in ID25. Birch was appointed an OBE in 1919.

He was a fellow of King's College, Cambridge, between 1915 and 1934 and a lecturer in history at Cambridge from 1921 until 1928. Birch left Cambridge to pursue an acting career in the 1930s, including the role of Widow Twankey in pantomime.

In 1939, he was part of a BBC television production in a Teresa Deevy play "In Search of Valour". 

He joined the Naval section at Bletchley Park in September 1939, and later became Head of the (German) Naval Section. He had to face the shortage of Bombes to decipher the Naval Enigma, which led to the use of American Bombes via OP-20-G. Birch was awarded a CMG in 1945.

Selected filmography 
 School for Stars (1935) - Robert Blake
 Jubilee Window (1935) - Ambrose Holroyd
 Cross Currents (1935) - Rev. Eustace Hickling
 Wolf's Clothing (1936) - Reverend John Laming
 Love at Sea (1936) - Mr. Godwin
 Such Is Life (1936) - Mockett
 Jump for Glory (1937) - Vicar
 Double Exposures (1937) - Kempton
 Twin Faces (1937) - Ben Zwigi
 Victoria the Great (1937) - Sir Charles Dilke
 Jennifer Hale (1937) - Sharman
 The Academy Decides (1937)
 Who Goes Next? (1938) - Capt. Grover
 The Challenge (1938) - Rev. Charles Hudson
 The Villiers Diamond (1938) - Silas Wade
 Lady in the Fog (1952) - Boswell - the airport manager
 Will Any Gentleman...? (1953) - Mr. Brown
 Face the Music (1954) - Trumpet Salesman

References

Sources
Ralph Erskine, Birch, Francis Lyall  (1889–1956), Oxford Dictionary of National Biography, Oxford University Press, 2004.
Action this Day edited by Michael Smith & Ralph Erskine (2001, Bantam London);

External links 
 
 Francis Birch at the Teresa Deevy Archive

1889 births
1956 deaths
British cryptographers
English male film actors
20th-century English male actors
Companions of the Order of St Michael and St George
Officers of the Order of the British Empire
Bletchley Park people
People educated at Eton College
Alumni of King's College, Cambridge
Fellows of King's College, Cambridge
Royal Navy officers of World War I
Royal Naval Volunteer Reserve personnel of World War I